Calodesma dioptis is a moth of the family Erebidae. It was described by Felder in 1874. It is found in Brazil, French Guiana and Bolivia.

References

Calodesma
Moths described in 1874